William, Will, Bill, or Billy Lockwood may refer to:

 Bill Lockwood (cricketer) (1868–1932), English cricketer
 Will Lockwood (ice hockey) (born 1998), American ice hockey player
 Will Lockwood (rower) (born 1988), Australian rower
 William Lockwood (Australian cricketer) (1868–1953), Australian cricketer
 William Lockwood (MP), Member of Parliament for Scarborough in the 1540s
 William Burley Lockwood (1917–2012), British academic
 William W. Lockwood (1906–1978), American academic